Felipe Ignacio Carballo Ares (born 4 October 1996) is a Uruguayan professional footballer who plays as a midfielder for Campeonato Brasileiro Série A club Grêmio.

Club career

Nacional
Born in Montevideo, Carballo was a Nacional youth graduate. He made his first team – and Primera División – debut on 28 February 2016, starting in a 0–2 away loss against Plaza Colonia.

Carballo scored his first professional goal on 10 April 2016, netting his team's third in a 4–2 away win against Defensor Sporting. After contributing with ten appearances, he returned to the youth side ahead of the 2016 season, but was included in the first team again in 2017.

Sevilla
On 29 August 2017, Carballo signed a five-year contract with Sevilla FC, being assigned to the reserves in Segunda División. He was sold for a fee around 2.5 million euros.

On 18 January 2019, Carballo was loaned out to his former club Nacional until the end of 2019. The loan spell was later extended for one further year. On 9 January 2021, Carballo signed a permanent three-year deal with Nacional.

Grêmio
On 20 December 2022, Grêmio announced the signing of Carballo on a contract until 2026.

International career
On 21 October 2022, Carballo was named in Uruguay's 55-man preliminary squad for the 2022 FIFA World Cup.

Career statistics

References

External links

1996 births
Living people
Footballers from Montevideo
Uruguayan footballers
Uruguayan expatriate footballers
Uruguay youth international footballers
Association football midfielders
Uruguayan Primera División players
Club Nacional de Football players
Segunda División players
Campeonato Brasileiro Série A players
Sevilla Atlético players
Grêmio Foot-Ball Porto Alegrense players
Uruguayan expatriate sportspeople in Spain
Uruguayan expatriate sportspeople in Brazil
Expatriate footballers in Spain
Expatriate footballers in Brazil